Rose Castle is a  fortified house in Cumbria, England, on a site that was home to the bishops of Carlisle from 1230 to 2009. It is within the parish of Dalston,  from Dalston itself, which is four miles southwest of Carlisle. The architects Anthony Salvin and Thomas Rickman were responsible for the alterations which took place in the 19th century.

The historical importance of Rose Castle is shown by its Grade I listing by Historic England.

Sale
In September 2015, Rose Castle was listed for sale, with a sale price in excess of £2,950,000. It has since been purchased with the aim to turn it into an international centre of reconciliation.

See also

Grade I listed buildings in Cumbria
Listed buildings in Dalston, Cumbria

References

External links

 Rose Castle Foundation
Raughton Head Parish Magazine
Gatehouse Project page
A brief history of Rose Castle Garden

Country houses in Cumbria
Grade I listed buildings in Cumbria
Thomas Rickman buildings
Grade I listed houses
Inglewood Forest
Episcopal palaces in England
Dalston, Cumbria